eBay is a global e-commerce website launched on September 3, 1995. Each acquisition is for the respective company in its entirety, unless otherwise specified. The acquisition date listed is the date of the agreement between eBay and the subject of the acquisition. The value of each acquisition is listed in United States dollars because eBay is headquartered in the United States. If the value of an acquisition is not listed, then it is undisclosed.

As of September 2014, eBay has acquired over 40 companies, the most expensive of which was the purchase of Skype, a Voice over Internet Protocol company, for US$2.6 billion in cash plus up to an additional US$1.5 billion if certain performance goals were met. The majority of companies acquired by eBay are based in the United States. Most of the acquired companies are related to online auctions.



Acquisitions

See also 

 List of largest mergers and acquisitions
 Lists of corporate acquisitions and mergers

Notes

References

EBay
eBay